The Red-finned kuruva (Systomus rufus) is a species of cyprinid fish endemic to India.  This species can reach a length of  SL. It is known only to a single stream in Kerala.

References 

Systomus
Freshwater fish of India
Fish described in 2014